Leeming is the name of several places in the world, including:

Leeming, Western Australia
Leeming, North Yorkshire, England 
Leeming Bar, North Yorkshire
location of RAF Leeming
Leeming, West Yorkshire, England 

Leeming is also the surname of several well-known people, including:

Carol Leeming, a British singer and songwriter.
David Leeming, Canadian politician
David Adams Leeming, American philologist
Jan Leeming (born 1942), a British TV presenter and newsreader
J. J. Leeming, a British road traffic engineer
John F. Leeming, co-founder of the Lancashire Aero Club and author of children's books
Marjorie Leeming (1903–1987), Canadian tennis player, badminton player and teacher